Bardaasht (English: Tolerance) is a 2004 Indian Hindi-language vigilante action-thriller film produced by Vijay Galani & directed by Eeshwar Nivas. It is based on the screenplay written by Vikram Bhatt. The film stars Bobby Deol, Lara Dutta, Ritesh Deshmukh, Tara Sharma and Rahul Dev, with Vishwajeet Pradhan, Ganesh Yadav, Nagesh Bhonsle, Shivaji Satam and Virendra Saxena in important supporting roles. The film focuses on the issue of police brutality.

Synopsis

Aditya Shrivastava (Bobby Deol) is a court martialled army officer. He has a brother, Anuj Shrivastava (Ritesh Deshmukh). Anuj gets angry at Aditya one day and runs away. Corrupt ACP Yashwant Thakur (Rahul Dev) helps Aditya find Anuj and later tells him that Anuj was killed in an encounter.

Aditya reads a police report which states that Anuj was running away with drugs and was shot dead on the spot. Aditya can't quite believe this, so he investigates it. He later meets Ramona (Tara Sharma), who reveals that ACP Yashwant Thakur and his two other police officers brutally killed Anuj for no apparent reason and lied to cover it up.

Aditya wants to take the matter to court and chooses Payal (Lara Dutta) as his lawyer.  However, after losing the case, Aditya decides to take matters into his own hands by holding and torturing the three captives until they confess their crime. He is successful and, having secretly recorded this evidence, shows it to the police commissioner; thus avenging his brother's death. The last scene shows Aditya performing the final rites of Anuj.

Cast
Bobby Deol as Lieutenant Major Aditya Shrivastava (ex-army officer)
Lara Dutta as Payal Lawyer, Aditya's fiance
Riteish Deshmukh as Anuj Shrivastava, Aditya's younger brother
Tara Sharma as Ramona (Anuj's girlfriend)
Rahul Dev as a Corrupt Assistant Commissioner Of Police Officer Yashwant Thakur, the main antagonist
Shivaji Satam as Police Commissioner
Vishwajeet Pradhan as a Corrupt Inspector Deepak Sawant
Virendra Saxena as Constable Mehmood
Aanjjan Srivastav as Dinanth Shrivastava
Surendra Pal as Payal Father and Army Lieutenant Colonel Senior Officer Of Major And Captain 
Raju Kher as A.Saxena,Ramona Father
Naresh Suri as College Principal
Ganesh Yadav as Corrupt Inspector Sunil Yadav
Nagesh Bhonsle as Advocate
Harsh Chhaya as Psychiatrist
Ashwin Kumar as Amit Chhabra
Kunal S. Kapur as Mohit Varshney
Chandrashekhar Gautam as Karan Bhanushali
Shruti Ulfat as Priya Agnihotri
Avni Mehta as Maya Chauhan
Gopal K Singh as Man at the morgue

Critical reception

Released in April 2004 Bardaasht received acclaimed critical reception. Taran Adarsh of Bollywood Hungama praised Bobby Deol's performance and wrote, "BARDAASHT is a triumph for Bobby Deol, who takes full advantage of the role offered to him and gives his best shot. He displays the gamut of emotions like a seasoned performer and delivers a knock-out performance. In fact, it won't be wrong to state that this is amongst Bobby's best performance to date!" Critic Subash K Jha praised the film wrote, "At a time when the film industry is busy showcasing cops as romanticised idealistic super-heroes, "Bardaasht" takes a cynical view of the police force. But the film portrays the reality. Every day law-abiding god-fearing citizen gets a taste of the criminalisation of the police force." Jha praises Deol's performance and writes, "Bobby Deol, who plays the lead role, drops his habitually languorous look and laidback demeanour to deliver a performance of substantial velocity. Deol makes the best of his silently simmering and suffering army man-turned-civilian role. As Aditya Shrivastava, Bobby is what his brother Sunny has repeatedly played in films like "Arjun" and "Ghayal". But Bobby gives the seething role his own spin." Rediff.com praises Bardaasht and writes "Bardaasht is pretty strong on the performance front. Bobby Deol does a good job. Look out for him in the scene where he sees his kid brother's dead body. His body language is frail, broken and numb," citing Deol's power-packed performance.

Soundtrack

Lyrics by Sameer.

References

External links
 
 

Films scored by Himesh Reshammiya
2000s Hindi-language films
2004 films
Films about drugs
Films about social issues in India
2004 action thriller films
Indian action thriller films
Indian vigilante films
Films directed by Eeshwar Nivas
2000s vigilante films
Indian films about revenge